Daniel F 'Danny' Muir was a Scottish football player, who played for Armadale, St Bernard's and Dumbarton during the 1920s and 1930s.

References 

Scottish footballers
Dumbarton F.C. players
Scottish Football League players
Armadale F.C. players
St Bernard's F.C. players
Association football fullbacks
Year of birth missing
Year of death missing